Matthias Kohler (born 9 June 1991) is a German football manager who works as assistant coach for Volendam.

Playing career
As a youth player, Kohler joined the youth academy of German Bundesliga side SC Freiburg after playing for the youth academy of FC Schaffhausen in the Swiss lower leagues.

Managerial career
Kohler started his career with the youth academy of South African club Cape Town All Stars.

In 2019, Kohler was appointed manager of AS Trenčín in the Slovakian top flight.

In 2020, he was appointed manager of Swiss third division team  FC Basel II.

References

External links
 

Living people
1991 births
German footballers
Association football midfielders
German football managers
AS Trenčín managers
Slovak Super Liga managers
German expatriate football managers
German expatriate sportspeople in Slovakia
Expatriate football managers in Slovakia
German expatriate sportspeople in Switzerland
Expatriate football managers in Switzerland
German expatriate sportspeople in the Netherlands
Expatriate football managers in the Netherlands